Ogeu-les-Bains is a railway station in Ogeu-les-Bains, Nouvelle-Aquitaine, France. The station opened in 1883 and is located on the Pau–Canfranc railway. The station is served by TER (local) services operated by the SNCF.

Train services
The following services currently call at Ogeu-les-Bains:
local service (TER Nouvelle-Aquitaine) Pau - Oloron-Sainte-Marie - Bedous

References

Railway stations in Pyrénées-Atlantiques
Railway stations in France opened in 1883